Harold Pinkus (born 27 September 1934) is an Australian former cricketer. He played two first-class matches for Tasmania between 1956 and 1957.

See also
 List of Tasmanian representative cricketers

References

External links
 

1934 births
Living people
Australian cricketers
Tasmania cricketers
Cricketers from Tasmania